The 1999 Samoa National League, or also known as the Upolo First Division, was the 11th edition of the Samoa National League, the top league of the Football Federation Samoa. Moata'a FC won their first title.

Teams
Each team participated in a qualifying tournament where the top four finishers in each Group North & Group South qualified for the league. The teams then participated in the normal league round-robin.

Group North
Vaitoloa – winner
Moamoa – runner-up
Vaiala
Kiwi

Group South
Moata'a – winner
Goldstar Sogi – runner-up
Togafuafua
Vaipuna

Standings

References

Samoa National League seasons
Samoa
football